Chusquea nana is a species of grass in the family Poaceae. It is found only in Ecuador.

References

nana
Endemic flora of Ecuador
Grasses of South America
Near threatened flora of South America
Taxonomy articles created by Polbot
Taxobox binomials not recognized by IUCN